Katherine Jessie Jean "Kate" Allen (born 25 April 1970, in Geelong, Australia) is an Australian-Austrian triathlete. She won the gold medal in the women's triathlon at the 2004 Summer Olympics in Athens.

Early life
Kate Allen grew up on a  sheep-farming property with her three brothers at Teesdale in southeastern Australia.

From an early age her parents encouraged her to run, and she used to frequently jog to primary school some 3 kilometres from home. At the age of four Allen began participating in Little Athletics at Landy Field in Geelong. She competed in junior athletics until the age of 14, winning a number of championships over 1500 m and 'cross-country' distance. Allen also enjoyed gymnastics in her early years, a sport that would prove important to her coordination skills during her triathlon career.

Allen graduated from Ballarat University as a nurse at age 20. She then travelled overseas. During one of her trips she met Marcel Diechtler in Kitzbühel, whom she married in 1999, who was a triathlon competitor for Austria. Diechtler encouraged Allen to take up triathlon, beginning in 1996.

Triathlon career
After some years of successful racing around Europe with her former coach Mario Huys Allen received Austrian citizenship in 2002 and started racing in the World Cup.
She took silver in only her third World Cup in Hamburg, Germany and won silver at the European Championships in Valencia, Spain.

Just eight years after beginning the sport, Allen won the 2004 Olympic triathlon in Athens. At the end of the swim leg Allen was in 44th place in the field of 51.  After the bicycle leg she was in 28th. During the run she progressively overtook twenty seven competitors to power past then-leader Australian Loretta Harrop just 150 metres from the finish line, winning the race in emphatic style.

Alongside her Olympic distance triathlon career, Allen showed several strong performances in racing at the Ironman distance. In 2002, she recorded the fastest Ironman debut time ever, completing the course in 8:58:24. She topped her performance in 2003, finishing in 8:54:01 hours, a personal record that still stands.

After the Olympic Games in Athens it was Allen's plan to only race at Ironman distances for 2005–2006, with the aim of winning the Ironman World Championships in Hawaii. After finishing 7th in 2002, Allen placed 5th in both 2005 and 2006.

At the 2008 Summer Olympics, she ranked 14th.

Achievements:

2002
 2nd place, Ironman Austria, Klagenfurt/Austria (08:58:24 hrs. - fastest Ironman debut in history)
 7th place, Ironman Hawaii, Kona/United States (09:38:40 hrs.)

2003
 1st place, Ironman Austria, Klagenfurt/Austria (08:54:01 hrs.)
 1st place, ITU Triathlon International race, Geneva/Switzerland
 2nd place, ITU Triathlon World Cup, Hamburg/Germany
 4th place, ITU Triathlon World Cup, Makuhari/Japan
 6th place, ITU Triathlon World Cup, Geelong/Australia
 Austrian Champion 2003 Triathlon Olympic Distance
 Austrian Champion 2003 Triathlon Ironman Distance

2004
 Olympic Champion, Athens/Greece
 Vice-European Champion, Valencia/Spain
 Austrian Sports Personality of the Year

2005
 1st place, Ironman Austria, Klagenfurt/Austria (9:07:03 hrs.)
 5th place, Ironman Hawaii, Kona/USA (9:22:08 hrs.)

2006
 1st place, Vienna City half-marathon (1:14:24 hrs.)
 5th place, Ironman Hawaii, Kona/USA (9:30:22 hrs.)

2007
 Vice-European Champion, Copenhagen/Denmark
 Vice-European Champion Team, Copenhagen/Danmark
 3rd place, ITU Triathlon World Cup, Salford/United Kingdom

2008
 8th place, World Championships Vancouver/Canada
 14th place, Beijing Olympics

Awards 
In 2004, Kate Allen received the "Decoration of Honour for Services to the Republic of Austria" (Goldenes Ehrenzeichen für Verdienste um die Republik Österreich).

She was voted 2004 Austrian Sportspersonality of the year and also received the Eurosport "SportStar Award 2004".

References

External links
  Official website
 Athlete Biography at beijing2008

1970 births
Living people
Austrian female triathletes
Olympic triathletes of Austria
Triathletes at the 2004 Summer Olympics
Triathletes at the 2008 Summer Olympics
Olympic gold medalists for Austria
Recipients of the Decoration of Honour for Services to the Republic of Austria
Sportspeople from Geelong
Olympic medalists in triathlon
Federation University Australia alumni
Australian emigrants to Austria
Medalists at the 2004 Summer Olympics